Prescott Franklin Cogswell (October 23, 1859 - January 15, 1960) served in the California legislature for the 33rd District for the 40th and 41st Sessions.

Biography
Cogswell was born in Thamesford, Ontario, Canada on October 23, 1859.

He was a member of the California State Assembly from 1906 to 1912, and of the California State Senate from 1912 to 1916.

From 1918 to 1926, Cogswell served on the Los Angeles County Board of Supervisors.

He died in El Monte, California on January 15, 1960.

A reservoir on the San Gabriel River was named in his honor.

References

External links
Join California Prescott F. Cogswell

Members of the California State Legislature
1859 births
1960 deaths
Los Angeles County Board of Supervisors
American centenarians
Men centenarians
20th-century American politicians
Members of the California State Assembly
California state senators
People from Oxford County, Ontario